Equinix, Inc. is an American multinational company headquartered in Redwood City, California, that specializes in Internet connection and data centers. The company is a leader in global colocation data center market share, with 248 data centers in 27 countries on five continents.

The company converted to a real estate investment trust (REIT) in January 2015.

History 
Equinix was founded in 1998 by Al Avery and Jay Adelson, two facilities managers at Digital Equipment Corporation. The firm promoted its data center platform as a neutral place where competing networks could connect and share data traffic.  The firm capitalized on the "network effect," through which each new customer would broaden the appeal of its platform.  It expanded to Asia-Pacific in 2002 and Europe in 2007, followed by Latin America in 2011, and the Middle East in 2012.

In 2018, according to data collected by the online publication Sludge, Equinix signed three contracts with the U.S. Customs and Border Protection to provide "information technology support equipment" totalling over $5 million. In September 2020, the company shifted its branding to describe itself as a "digital infrastructure company".

Acquisitions and expansion 

In 2002, Equinix merged with i-STT, the Internet infrastructure service subsidiary of Singapore Technologies Telemedia, and Pihana Pacific. This established the company's presence in China, Singapore, Australia and Japan. In 2007, the firm announced a $2 billion international expansion plan and entered the European market by acquiring data center operator IXEurope and its facilities. In 2010, Equinix opened its 50th data center, in London.  Over the next seven years, the company nearly tripled its data center portfolio, growth the company attributed to increased demand caused by the emergence of cloud computing, the Internet of Things and big data.

In 2010, the company purchased Switch and Data Facilities Company, Inc., a U.S. internet exchange and colocation services provider. The company extended its operations to the Middle East and in Southeast Asia in 2012. Also in 2012, it acquired Hong Kong-based data center provider Asia-Tone. In 2014, Equinix increased its Latin American presence when it acquired ALOG Datacenters of Brazil S.A., the country's leading provider of carrier-neutral data centers.

In 2015, Equinix converted to a real estate investment trust (REIT) to gain tax advantages and add shareholder value. That same year, it acquired the professional services company Nimbo.

In May 2015, Equinix said it would purchase the British company TelecityGroup, the largest acquisition in company history. The offer was cleared by the European Commission in November after Equinix agreed to sell eight of its data centers around Europe to Digital Realty, but it still retained Telecity Harbour Exchange data center in London Docklands. In January 2016, Equinix completed the Telecity acquisition in a transaction valued at approximately $3.8 billion. The addition of these  data centers more than doubled Equinix's capacity in Europe. In December 2015, the company purchased Japanese provider Bit-Isle, adding six data centers in Japan.

In 2016, Equinix opened new data centers in Dallas, Sydney and Tokyo and announced a deal to acquire 29 data centers in 15 markets from Verizon. In 2017, the firm also opened a new data center in São Paulo.

In 2017, Equinix acquired Itconic, which expanded its data center footprint into Spain and Portugal.

In 2018, Equinix purchased the Dallas Infomart building, where it had already been operating four data centers. It also acquired Australian data center provider Metronode and its 10 data centers. The company opened its first data center in South Korea the next year.

In 2020, Equinix finalized the purchase of Packet, a startup that provided bare-metal servers as a cloud service. The company expanded into India in August 2020, with the acquisition of GPX India, including a campus in Mumbai with two data centers. In October 2020, Equinix completed the acquisition of 13 Bell Canada data centers. The company also invested heavily in hyperscale xScale data centers.

On December 7, 2021, Equinix announced its acquisition of Main One, a West African data center and connectivity solutions provider, for $320 million.

In March 2022, Equinix expanded into Chile and Peru with $758 million acquisition of 4 Data Centers from Entel.

Environmental impact 

In 2015, the company made a long-term pledge to power its entire data center platform with clean and renewable energy. The pledge followed criticism in 2014 from the environmental group Greenpeace, which said in an annual report on the environmental practices of Internet companies that Equinix had an insufficient commitment to renewable energy and carbon emissions mitigation. The company signed deals with wind farms in Texas and Oklahoma to buy enough renewable energy to offset the energy consumption of its North American data center portfolio.

In 2019, the U.S. Environmental Protection Agency named Equinix one of 17 Green Power Partners leading the transition to renewable energy.

In September 2020, Equinix priced $1.35 billion in green bonds to finance new and existing green projects. At the same time, the company announced a Green Finance Framework to standardize transparency reporting for green debt disclosures. In November 2020, the EPA gave Equinix its 2020 Green Power Partner of the Year award.

In January 2021, Equinix joined the Climate Neutral Data Centre Pact, and therefore engaged to have data centres climate neutral by 2030.

Data centers 

Equinix claims to have invested more than $25 billion in its data center platform. The firm calls its data centers International Business Exchanges (IBXs). In 2017, the company launched its own data center infrastructure management platform, IBX SmartView. The company's Internet Exchange service allows ISPs and enterprises to exchange Internet traffic through a global peering tool.

Data center (IBX) locations 
 Americas: United States, Brazil, Canada, Colombia, Chile, Mexico, Peru
 Asia-Pacific: Australia, China, Hong Kong, Indonesia, Japan, South Korea, Singapore, India
 Europe and Middle East: Bulgaria, Finland, France, Germany, Ireland, Italy, Netherlands, Poland, Portugal, Spain, Sweden, Switzerland, Turkey, United Arab Emirates, United Kingdom.

See also
 Cloud computing
 Internet exchange
 Peering
 List of Internet exchange points

References

External links

 

American companies established in 1998
Real estate companies established in 1998
Telecommunications companies established in 1998
Real estate companies of the United States
Telecommunications companies of the United States
2000 initial public offerings
Companies listed on the Nasdaq
Data centers
Companies based in Redwood City, California
1998 establishments in California